The Huanghai N3 is a mid-size pickup truck produced and sold by SG Automotive (曙光汽车) under the Huanghai Auto (黄海) marque.

Overview

The Huanghai N3 pickup truck debuted in China during the 2017 Shanghai Auto Show, and was available in the Chinese car market in July 2017. The first model to debut is the Huanghai N3A. The A is for the base model, a sportier S model was revealed later.

The Huanghai N3 is available with four engines including a 2.4 liter four-cylinder petrol engine producing 218 hp and 320 nm of torque, a 2.4 liter four-cylinder turbo petrol engine and a 2.5 liter turbocharged four-cylinder diesel engine producing 143 hp and 340 nm of torque. Transmission options include a 6-speed manual gearbox, and a 6-speed automatic gearbox. Prices of the Huanghai N3 ranges from 111,800 yuan to 160,800 yuan.

References

External links

 Huanghai Auto website

N3
Pickup trucks
2010s cars
Rear-wheel-drive vehicles
All-wheel-drive vehicles
Cars introduced in 2017
Trucks of China